The 2016 Bound for Glory was a professional wrestling pay-per-view (PPV) event produced by Total Nonstop Action Wrestling (TNA). It took place on October 2, 2016 at the Impact Zone in Orlando, Florida, the first time since the inaugural 2005 event to be held at the venue. It was the twelfth event in the Bound for Glory chronology, the second and last pay-per-view event of 2016 from TNA. It would also be the final pay per view under the TNA name. It included the induction of Gail Kim into the TNA Hall of Fame, with Christy Hemme, Taryn Terrell and Awesome Kong returning to induct her. The event also featured the official TNA debut of Cody and Brandi Rhodes.

Eight matches, one of which was a match taped for TNA Xplosion, took place at the event. In the main event, Lashley defeated Ethan Carter III to retain the TNA World Heavyweight Championship, and The Hardys (Broken Matt and Brother Nero) defeated Decay (Abyss and Crazzy Steve) in The Great War to become the TNA World Tag Team Champions.

In October 2017, with the launch of the Global Wrestling Network, the event became available to stream on demand.

Storylines

Bound for Glory featured professional wrestling matches involving different wrestlers from pre-existing scripted feuds and storylines. Wrestlers portrayed villains, heroes, or less distinguishable characters in the scripted events that built tension and culminate in a wrestling match or series of matches.

On July 8, 2016, TNA is announced that Impact Wrestling would begin airing at 8pm EST on Thursday nights on July 21, the night that would feature the start of the "Bound For Glory Playoff" to determine a new #1 contender to the TNA World Heavyweight Championship. In the first round, Broken Matt, Ethan Carter III, Drew Galloway and Mike Bennett advanced to the semifinals with victories over James Storm, Eli Drake, Bram and Jeff Hardy respectively. Second round action lead to Carter pinning Broken Matt Hardy, and Bennett pinning Galloway. In the final, Carter pinned Bennett to become the number one contender. On the August 4 episode of Impact Wrestling, James Storm defeated Eli Drake to win the TNA King of the Mountain Championship. Lashley would then come out and challenge Storm to a match for his King of the Mountain Championship, whilst putting his TNA World Heavyweight Championship and TNA X Division Championship on the line as well, which Lashley won.

The title was introduced at the August 13, 2016 tapings of TNA's television program Impact Wrestling after TNA President Billy Corgan announced that the TNA King of the Mountain Championship would be deactivated and retired in favor for the new Impact Grand Championship. Corgan also announced an eight-man single elimination tournament that would feature new rules that would apply to the title. The new rules would be similar to how bouts were contested in professional wrestling in Europe in which each match will consist of three timed rounds, with a team of judges to award the win based on points, if there is no winner via pin or submission within the time limit. The final match was supposed to be scheduled to be at Bound for Glory to determine the inaugural champion, however, TNA Wrestling announced two days before the PPV that Drew Galloway had an undisclosed injury and will not be able to compete at Bound for Glory. Eddie Edwards was soon announced to be Aron Rex's new opponent for the Impact Grand Championship finals.

On the August 19 episode of Impact Wrestling, The Hardys won an Ascension to Hell (Ladder match) to become the number one contenders for the TNA World Tag Team Championship against Decay.

On the September 1 episode of Impact Wrestling, Mike Bennett failed to win the TNA World Heavyweight Champion from Lashley in a no-disqualification match after Moose refused to help him. Afterwards, Bennett called Moose "a failed football player" before Moose attacked him, thus ending their partnership and turning face in the process.

On September 15, Gail Kim won a gauntlet match to become the number one contender for the TNA Knockouts Championship, Kim was then scheduled to face Maria for the title.

Gauntlet entrances and eliminations

On September 22, TNA announced that the Bound for Gold concept will be making a return for this year's twelfth Bound for Glory event.

On October 2, TNA announced that DJZ will defend his TNA X Division Championship against Trevor Lee at Bound for Glory.

The status of the event was called into question in the days preceding it, with reports indicating that the promotion lacked the funds to go forward and was searching for a new buyer  After spending the week leading into the PPV negotiating with President Billy Corgan, as well as WWE, New York Post reported that an unidentified third party had given the company the funds needed to proceed with the event.  It was later learned that the third party was Anthem Sports & Entertainment, which proceeded to purchase TNA.

Results

Bound for Gold Gauntlet entrances and eliminations

See also

 Bound for Glory Series
 2016 in professional wrestling

References

External links

Bound for Glory (wrestling pay-per-view)
Professional wrestling shows in Orlando, Florida
2016 in professional wrestling in Florida
October 2016 events in the United States
2016 Total Nonstop Action Wrestling pay-per-view events